Casey Powell (born February 18, 1976) is a Hall of Fame American former college and professional lacrosse player from West Carthage, New York. In 1998, he graduated from Syracuse University, where he was a four-time USILA All-American. Powell was the NCAA Division I Most Outstanding Player in 1997 and 1998. Powell was inducted into the National Lacrosse Hall of Fame in 2017.

Powell played in Major League Lacrosse, the semi-professional field lacrosse league, from its first year in 2001 through 2016, although he played in only 8 games between 2009 and 2013. Yet Powell ranks sixth in goals (243), second in assists (237), and third in points (484) on the MLL career totals list as of 2017. Powell also tops the all-time MLL playoff point chart with 40. In 2005 and 2014, he won the MLL Offensive Player of the Year award. Powell earned the MVP award in 2014 at age 38.

After retiring from professional lacrosse, Powell shifted focus to other business and philanthropic endeavors. Powell started the World Lacrosse Foundation, a non-profit organization for the advancement of lacrosse in 2015. He is a founder of Speed Lacrosse, a modified version of the sport.

His two younger brothers, Ryan and Mikey, were also lacrosse stars at Syracuse, where they all wore jersey number 22.

Syracuse University
Powell was a three-time first-team All-American attackman and midfielder, and helped Syracuse win the 1995 NCAA National Championship. Powell is the only player in NCAA Division I lacrosse history to earn first-team All-American honors at more than one position. He even won Most Outstanding Player at two positions, midfield in 1996 and attack in 1998. Powell followed Gary Gait in wearing the revered number 22 jersey at Syracuse University. His two younger brothers, Ryan and Mikey, carried on the tradition as well.

Major League Lacrosse
In 2001, Powell was signed by the Long Island Lizards of Major League Lacrosse (MLL), and led the Lizards to the first-ever MLL Championship. In 2003, the Lizards won the Championship again, and after the season, Powell was traded to the Rochester Rattlers in a five-player deal. During the 2004 season, Powell finished second on the Rattlers with 57 points (32 goals, 24 assists, 1 two-point goal).

2005 was a career year for Powell. He led the Rattlers in scoring and ranked second in the league with 57 points (27 goals, 30 assists). His 30 assists were second in the league behind Conor Gill's 34, and was named Offensive Player of the Week three times in the final four weeks of the season.

Casey and his brothers sat out the 2009 MLL season, as they did not report to their teams as of April 1 contract deadline. Powell returned in 2011, and played for the Hamilton Nationals.

During the 2011 season  MLL Championship game, Powell injured his knee and needed to be helped off the field, he had 4 goals in a 10-9 Nationals loss to the Boston Cannons in the MLL championship game, his lacrosse future in doubt. But just days later he announced that an MRI revealed no tear in his ACL, so the injury was not as serious as first thought.

After playing only three games in the 2012 season, Powell retired from the MLL, but was drafted by Chesapeake Bayhawks in the supplemental draft that year. He returned in 2013 and played with the Bayhawks.

National Lacrosse League
Powell was the first overall draft choice of the Rochester Knighthawks of the National Lacrosse League (NLL) in the 1998 entry draft and played two seasons for the Knighthawks. He was traded to the Buffalo Bandits in 2001 and signed a contract, but never reported. In 2003, the Bandits traded him to the Anaheim Storm. Powell led the Storm in scoring and was named to the All-Star team in both the 2004 and 2005 seasons.

The Storm suspended operations after the 2005 season, and Powell was chosen second overall by the Portland LumberJax, although he elected not to play in the 2006 season. In September 2006, Powell was traded yet again, this time to the expansion New York Titans, and was named to the All-Star team in 2007, 2008, and 2009. Following the contraction of the Titans in 2010, the Boston Blazers acquired Powell in a dispersal draft.

After one year in Boston, the Blazers also went dark, and Powell was chosen by the Rochester Knighthawks in the resulting dispersal draft.

Powell has also hosted a weekly one-hour show on Sirius Satellite Radio called "Inside the NLL with Casey Powell" since 2007.

International

Powell captained the U.S. Men's National Team in the 2006 World Lacrosse Championship, winning the silver medal. He was also the captain of the U.S. Men's Indoor National Team in 2011, where he was named the tournament MVP. Powell was an assistant captain at the 2015 World Indoor Lacrosse Championship. The U.S. won bronze medals in both indoor championships.

Honors and awards
 1st Team All-American (1996, '97, '98)
 2nd Team All-American (1995)
 Lt. Raymond Enners Award - Division I Most Outstanding Player (1997, '98)
 Jack Turnbull Award - Division I National Attackman of the Year (1998)
 McLaughlin Award - Division I National Midfielder of the Year (1996)
 Four-time NCAA All-Tournament team member (1995–98)
 MLL Offensive Player of the Year (2005)
 NLL Most Valuable Player (2010)  - Powell is the only American player to be named NLL MVP
 MLL Offensive Player of the Year (2014)
 MLL Most Valuable Player (2014)
 Named to Lacrosse Magazine's All-Century Team
 LacrosseAllStars.com named Powell the #1 indoor/outdoor American lacrosse player to date (2014)
 National Lacrosse Hall of Fame (2017)
 Professional Lacrosse Hall of Fame (2022)

Professional Lacrosse Hall of Fame
On June 18, 2022, Powell was inducted into the Professional Lacrosse Hall of Fame as one of the eleven members of the inaugural class of inductees.

Career statistics

NCAA

Powell led the country in points and points per game in 1997 (83, 5.93) and 1998 (78, 5.57). 287 career points is tied for 14th all-time with his brother, Ryan Powell.

NLL

MLL

Canadian Lacrosse Association

See also
1995 NCAA Division I Men's Lacrosse Championship
List of family relations in the National Lacrosse League
Mike Powell
NCAA Men's Division I Lacrosse Records
Ryan Powell
Syracuse Orange men's lacrosse

References

External links
Official website
Speed Lacrosse
Casey Powell World Lacrosse Foundation
The Legacy of Casey Powell

1976 births
Living people
Boston Blazers players
Major League Lacrosse major award winners
Major League Lacrosse players
National Lacrosse League All-Stars
National Lacrosse League major award winners
New York Titans (lacrosse) players
Orlando Titans players
People from Jefferson County, New York
Rochester Knighthawks players
Lacrosse players from New York (state)
Syracuse Orange men's lacrosse players
Lacrosse midfielders
Lacrosse forwards
Colorado Mammoth players
Anaheim Storm players
Florida Launch players
Chesapeake Bayhawks players
Hamilton Nationals players
New York Lizards players
Rochester Rattlers players